John Boyagis (26 January 1928 – 22 July 2020) was a British alpine skier. He competed at the 1948 Winter Olympics and the 1952 Winter Olympics. He died on 22 July 2020 at the age of 92.

References

External links
 

1928 births
2020 deaths
Alpine skiers at the 1948 Winter Olympics
Alpine skiers at the 1952 Winter Olympics
British male alpine skiers
Olympic alpine skiers of Great Britain
British people in colonial India
Sportspeople from Mumbai